For Monkeys is the third album by Swedish punk rock band Millencolin, released on 20 April 1997 in Sweden by Burning Heart Records and on 20 May 1997 in the United States by Epitaph Records. "Lozin' Must" was released as the album's single, with an accompanying music video.

Track listing
All songs written by Nikola Sarcevic, except where noted.

Japanese edition bonus tracks
 "An Elf and His Zippo"
 "Israelites"
 "Vixen"

Brazilian edition bonus tracks
 "Puzzle" (live)

Personnel

Millencolin
Nikola Sarcevic - lead vocals, bass
Erik Ohlsson - guitar
Mathias Färm - guitar
Fredrik Larzon - drums

External links

For Monkeys at YouTube (streamed copy where licensed)

Millencolin albums
1997 albums
Epitaph Records albums
Burning Heart Records albums